Mark Wayne Alleyne  (born 23 May 1968) is a former English cricket coach and first-class cricketer who made ten One Day International appearances for England between 1998/99 and 2000/01.

Classed as an  all-rounder, he mostly batted in the middle of the order and bowled at a medium pace, but he has also kept wicket for both England and his county, Gloucestershire.

He is the first Black British and third Black overall to coach an English first-class cricket team after Derief Taylor and John Shepherd.

Domestic career
Alleyne impressed early for Gloucestershire, scoring a century for them at 18 and a double-hundred at 22, being in both cases the youngest to achieve the feat for the county.

In 2000 he led Gloucestershire to two one-day cups and the National League title, just missing out on promotion in the County Championship, his achievements winning him a Wisden Cricketer of the Year spot. In the ensuing few years he became renowned as a leading tactician in the one-day form of county cricket, leading Gloucestershire to 4 one day knockout cups in 6 years.

In 2001, however, his performances fell away somewhat, especially with the bat, and Alleyne relinquished the captaincy to Chris Taylor in 2004. Indeed, he played just four county matches that year and did not make his first appearance in 2005 until 10 June.

International career
He replaced Jack Russell as captain in 1997, and on the 1998/99 tour of Australia made his England debut at Brisbane.

In February 2020, he was named in England's squad for the Over-50s Cricket World Cup in South Africa. However, the tournament was cancelled during the third round of matches due to the coronavirus pandemic.

Coaching career
After coach John Bracewell left Gloucestershire Cricket Club to join the New Zealand Test Team, Mark took over as Head Coach at Gloucestershire between 2004 and 2007 narrowly missing out on the Twenty20 title in 2007. He stood down as coach by mutual consent in February 2008 with nine months of his contract remaining. Alleyne then took up coaching at the National Performance Centre at Loughborough, where he coached the England Under-15s.   In February 2009 he has been named as the new MCC head coach, succeeding Clive Radley, who retired after a 48-year association with Lord's.

Alleyne was awarded the MBE for services to cricket in the Queen's New Year Honours list for 2004. He is also Chairman of the Professional Cricket Coaches Association.

References

English cricketers
England One Day International cricketers
Gloucestershire cricket captains
Gloucestershire cricketers
Wisden Cricketers of the Year
1968 births
Living people
Members of the Order of the British Empire
First-Class Counties Select XI cricketers
Black British sportsmen
English cricket coaches